The Basilica of Santa Maria in Trastevere) is a titular minor basilica in the Trastevere district of Rome, and one of the oldest churches of Rome. The basic floor plan and wall structure of the church date back to the 340s, and much of the structure to 1140–43. The first sanctuary was built in 221 and 227 by Pope Callixtus I and later completed by Pope Julius I. The church has large areas of important mosaics from the late 13th century by Pietro Cavallini.

History

The inscription on the episcopal throne states that this is the first church in Rome dedicated to Mary, mother of Jesus, although some claim that privilege belongs to the Basilica di Santa Maria Maggiore. It is certainly one of the oldest churches in the city. 

The predecessor of the present church was probably built in the early fourth century and that church was itself the successor to one of the tituli, early Christian basilicas ascribed to a patron and perhaps literally inscribed with his name. Although nothing remains to establish with certainty where any of the public Christian edifices of Rome before the time of Constantine the Great were situated, the basilica on this site was known as Titulus Callisti, based on a legend in the Liber Pontificalis, which ascribed the earliest church here to a foundation by Pope Callixtus I (died 222), whose remains, translated to the new structure, are preserved under the altar.

Callixtus founded a house-church here about 220 on the site of the Taberna meritoria, a refuge for retired soldiers. The area was made available for Christian use by Emperor Alexander Severus when he settled a dispute between the Christians and tavern-keepers, saying, according to the Liber Pontificalis "I prefer that it should belong to those who honor God, whatever be their form of worship." In 340, it was rebuilt on a larger scale by Pope Julius I. The church underwent two restorations in the fifth and eighth centuries and in 1140-43 it was re-erected on its old foundations under Pope Innocent II. 

The inscriptions found in Santa Maria in Trastevere, a valuable resource illustrating the history of the Basilica, were collected and published by Vincenzo Forcella.

Exterior

The Romanesque campanile is from the 12th century. Near the top, a niche protects a mosaic from the 13th century of the Madonna and Child by Pietro Cavallini. It depicts the Madonna enthroned and suckling the Child, flanked by 10 women holding lamps. This image on the façade showing Mary nursing Jesus is an early example of a popular late-medieval and renaissance type of image of the Virgin. The motif itself originated much earlier, with significant seventh-century Coptic examples at Wadi Natrun in Egypt.

The façade of the church was restored in 1702 by Carlo Fontana. It is surmounted by a balustrade decorated with the statues of four popes. He replaced the ancient porch with a sloping tiled roof — seen in Falda's view above — with the present classicizing one. The octagonal fountain in the piazza in front of the church (Piazza di Santa Maria in Trastevere), which already appears in a map of 1472, was restored by Fontana.

Interior
The present nave preserves its original (pre-12th century) basilica plan and stands on the earlier foundations. The 22 granite columns with Ionic and Corinthian capitals that separate the nave from the aisles came from the ruins of the Baths of Caracalla, as did the lintel of the entrance door.  When scholarship during the 19th century identified the faces in their carved decoration as Isis, Serapis and Harpocrates, a restoration under Pius IX in 1870 hammered off the offending faces.

Domenichino's octagonal ceiling painting, Assumption of the Virgin (1617) fits in the coffered ceiling that he designed.
 
There are a number of 12th and late 13th-century mosaics in the basilica. The "Coronation of the Virgin" (1130–1143) sits atop an apse vault, and depicts Pope Innocent II holding a model of the church. Below are mosaics on the subject of the "Life of the Virgin" by Pietro Cavallini (1291).

In the Capella Altemps there is a unique icon of the enthroned Virgin and Child "The Madonna della Clemenza", a panel painting in encaustic, dated between the 6th and 9th century CE, probably of the Byzantine origins. The Madonna della Clemenza is one of the five oldest existing Marian Icons from the medieval period. Its proximity to the rise of Christianity is one of the reasons it was believed to be a divine image.

The fifth chapel to the left is the Avila Chapel designed by Antonio Gherardi. This, and his Chapel of S. Cecilia in San Carlo ai Catinari are two of the most architecturally inventive chapels of the late-17th century in Rome. The lower order of the chapel is fairly dark and employs Borromini-like forms. In the dome, there is an opening or oculus from which four putti emerge to carry a central tempietto, all of which frames a light-filled chamber above, illuminated by windows not visible from below. Complexively, four different types of direct and indirect lighting are placed into the borders of a small space of a "pre-built side-chapel facing south along the left side-aisle of the medieval church", producing a unique "instance of the scenic use of light in baroque architecture."

The church keeps a relic of Saint Apollonia, her head, as well as a portion of the Holy Sponge. Among those buried in the church are Pope Callixtus I, Pope Innocent II, Antipope Anacletus II, Cardinal Philippe of Alençon and Cardinal Lorenzo Campeggio.

The titulus
Ancient sources maintain that the titulus S. Mariae was established by Pope Alexander I around 112. Later traditions give the names of the early patrons of the tituli and have retrospectively assigned them the title of cardinal: thus at that time, the cardinal-patron of this basilica, these traditions assert, would have been  Calepodius. Pope Callixtus I confirmed the titulus in 221; to honor him it was changed into Ss. Callisti et Iuliani; it was renamed S. Mariae trans Tiberim by Innocent II.  By the 12th century, cardinal deacons as well as the presbyters had long been dispensed from personal service at the tituli. Among the past cardinal priests holding the honorary titulus of Santa Maria in Trastevere have been James Gibbons, Pope Leo XII, Józef Glemp, and Cardinal Henry Benedict Stuart, whose coat of arms, topped by a crown (some hailed him as King Henry IX of England) rather than a galero (red hat), is visible over the screen to the right of the altar.  The incumbent titular holder is Carlos Osoro Sierra Archbishop of Madrid since November 19, 2016 upon the death of Loris Francesco Capovilla, the oldest living cardinal at the time of his death on 26 May 2016.

Significant events

In July 2014, the wedding of Prince Amedeo of Belgium, Archduke of Austria-Este, and Elisabetta Rosboch von Wolkenstein was held at the basilica.

See also
 Roman Catholic Marian churches
 Fountain in Piazza Santa Maria in Trastevere

References

External links
 "Titulus" article, Catholic Encyclopedia (1908) 
  "Roman Monographies: Fountains Part III" Fountain in Piazza Santa Maria in Trastevere
 "Church Location on the Map and more info"
 "3D model of the balisica in Sketchfab"
 High-resolution 360° Panoramas and Images of Santa Maria in Trastevere | Art Atlas

4th-century churches
12th-century Roman Catholic church buildings in Italy
Saint Mary
Roman Catholic churches completed in 1143
Burial places of popes
 
Mosaics
Roman Catholic churches completed in 1702
Romanesque architecture in Lazio
Titular churches
Saint Mary